The 1893 Hillsdale Dales football team was an American football team that represented Hillsdale College in the 1893 college football season. The team compiled a 4–1 record with its only loss being against Notre Dame at South Bend, Indiana.

Schedule

References

Hillsdale
Hillsdale Chargers football seasons
Hillsdale Dales football